Corrado Lorefice (born 12 October 1962) is an Italian prelate of the Catholic Church. He has been the Archbishop of Palermo since 5 December 2015.

Biography
He was born on 12 October 1962 in Ispica, in the Province of Ragusa, Italy.

He was ordained a deacon on 26 September 1986 in Noto Cathedral by Bishop Salvatore Nicolosi, who ordained him as a priest of the Diocese of Noto on 30 December 1987 in the church of Santissima Annunziata in Ispica.

He has been an activist in opposing the Mafia and on behalf of the victims of human trafficking and prostitution. He has written favorable assessments of liberation theology.

Pope Francis appointed him Archbishop of Palermo on 27 October 2015. On 5 December he was consecrated a bishop by Cardinal Paolo Romeo, emeritus Archbishop of Palermo, and installed there.

In June 2017 he was recognized by the Raoul Wallenberg Foundation for donating a chapel to serve as a synagogue for the Jewish community of Naples, dormant for centuries but struggling to revive.

Publications 
Gettate le reti: itinerario parrocchiale di preghiera per le vocazioni (Milan: Edizioni Paoline, 2004), 
Dossetti e Lercaro: la Chiesa povera e dei poveri nella prospettiva del Concilio Vaticano II (Milan: Edizioni Paoline, 2011), 
La compagnia del Vangelo: discorsi e idee di don Pino Puglisi a Palermo (Reggio Emilia: San Lorenzo, 2014),

See also

References

External links
Catholic Hierarchy

Living people
1962 births
Roman Catholic archbishops of Palermo
20th-century Roman Catholics
21st-century Roman Catholics
Religious leaders from the Province of Ragusa